Éditions Le Manuscrit is a French publishing house.

History
Founded in 2000 by Christian Berst, an art gallery owner and specialist in outsider art, in the chapitre.com line which he had also co-founded and headed it was taken over at the end of 2001 by financier Nicolas Philippe then by éditions StoryLab in 2015. Le Manuscrit was one of the first French houses  to publish books simultaneously in e-book and paper format via print on demand.

Its catalogue now includes around 7000 books, available in all formats.

Collections

References

External links 
  Official site

Small press publishing companies
Companies based in Paris
Companies established in 2000
Book publishing companies of France